Parelectra is a genus of moths of the family Noctuidae. The genus was erected by Paul Dognin in 1914.

Species
Parelectra exaggerata Schaus, 1914
Parelectra homochroa Dognin, 1914

References

Catocalinae